Sergei Yuryevich Ponomarenko (born 12 January 1987) is a Russian former professional football player.

Club career
He made his Russian Premier League debut for FC Krylia Sovetov Samara on 12 March 2011 in a game against PFC Spartak Nalchik.

External links
 

1987 births
Footballers from Moscow
Living people
Russian footballers
FC Khimki players
Russian Premier League players
PFC Krylia Sovetov Samara players
FC Luch Vladivostok players
Association football defenders